George Thomson Chapman (14 June 1824–24 June 1881) was a New Zealand merchant, bookseller and publisher . He was born in Stonehaven, Kincardineshire, Scotland on 14 June 1824.

Select bibliography

Maps
 Chapman's map of the Waikato with Raglan, Kawhia and Tauranga districts by J. Wareham (1866)
 Chapman's Map of the North Island of New Zealand including the Provinces of Auckland, Taranaki, Hawke's Bay, and Wellington with all the recent surveys(1866)

References

1824 births
1881 deaths
New Zealand publishers (people)
Scottish emigrants to New Zealand
New Zealand booksellers
People from Stonehaven